Michishita (written: 道下) is a Japanese surname Notable people with the surname include:

, Japanese politician
 Masashi Michishita, a contender in the 2009–10 ISU Speed Skating World Cup – Men's 5000 and 10000 metres
, Japanese Paralympic athlete
 Momo Michishita, composer for the pet simulation role-playing game Zoobles! Spring to Life!
 Shinsuke Michishita, bandleader for the Japanese psychedelic rock group LSD March

Fictional characters
 Michishita, a character in the manga series Seitokai Yakuindomo
 Masaki Michishita, a character in the manga Kuso Miso Technique

Japanese-language surnames